The 2020–21 Second League was the 66th season of the Second League, the second tier of the Bulgarian football league system, and the 5th season under this name and current league structure. It was delayed by two weeks due to the COVID-19 situation in Bulgaria, which saw footballers from a number of the participating teams testing positive for COVID-19 in July 2020, with Minyor Pernik especially affected. The season began in August 2020.

The first game of the season was played on 7 August 2020, between Hebar and Pirin Blagoevgrad, ending in a draw.

On 28 September 2020, Vitosha Bistritsa was excluded from the league, after the club announced on the same day that they will withdraw from the competition due to financial problems. The club also announced that they will fold their senior team, only remaining active at youth level. Following Vitosha’s expulsion from the league, the BFU announced that it would annul all of Vitosha’s results from the start of the league until 28 September.

The season started with spectators being allowed (albeit at a reduced stadium capacity), but on 27 October 2020, following a worsening of the epidemiological situation in Bulgaria, Minister of Health Kostadin Angelov issued a decree valid from 29 October until 12 November, stipulating that all matches are to be held behind closed doors. On 12 November 2020, the ban regarding the presence of spectators was extended at least until 30 November. Fans were once again allowed from 24 April 2021 onwards, at 30% stadium capacity, with a maximum of 1000 people per stand. 

On 7 December 2020, the match between Ludogorets II and Neftochimic was abandoned early in the first half with the score 2:0 in favour of the hosts after a Neftochimic player sustained an injury, reducing his side to 6 men. The guests had started the match with 7 players due to a wage-related boycott from the senior footballers and a ban on players under the age of 18 participating in sports events because of the coronavirus. Ludogorets II were eventually awarded a 5:0 win.

After the first half of the season ended in December, Kariana Erden announced that the team would withdraw from the league, due to personal reasons related to its owners. Kariana's results would not be annulled, though, as per the BFU rules, teams that withdraw from the league during, or after the winter break will not have their results annulled.

On 23 April 2021, Pirin Blagoevgrad were promoted to the First League after a 2-0 away win against Litex Lovech.

Teams
The following teams have changed division since the 2019–20 season.

To Second League 
Promoted from Third League
 Dobrudzha Dobrich
 Sozopol
 Yantra Gabrovo
 Minyor Pernik
 Septemvri Simitli
 Sportist Svoge

Relegated from First League
 Vitosha Bistritsa
 Dunav Ruse

From Second League 
Relegated to Third League
 Pomorie
 Spartak Pleven
 Spartak Varna
 Botev Galabovo
 Chernomorets Balchik

Promoted to First League
 CSKA 1948 Sofia
 Montana
Note: Dunav Ruse, who were relegated from the First League, failed to obtain a professional license from the Bulgarian Football Union with the team instead entering the Northeast group of the Third Football League. As a result, the Second League will consist of only 17 teams with no replacement team for Dunav's vacated spot.

Stadia and locations

Personnel and sponsorship

Note: Flags indicate national team as has been defined under FIFA eligibility rules. Players and managers may hold more than one non-FIFA nationality.

Note: Individual clubs may wear jerseys with advertising. However, only one sponsorship is permitted per jersey for official tournaments organised by UEFA in addition to that of the kit manufacturer (exceptions are made for non-profit organisations).
Clubs in the domestic league can have more than one sponsorship per jersey which can feature on the front of the shirt, incorporated with the main sponsor or in place of it; or on the back, either below the squad number or on the collar area. Shorts also have space available for advertisement.

Managerial changes

League table

Results

Positions by round

Transfers
 List of Bulgarian football transfers summer 2020

References 

2020-21
2
Bul